is an athlete from Japan.  She competes in archery.

Kawasaki represented Japan at the 2004 Summer Olympics.  She placed 37th in the women's individual ranking round with a 72-arrow score of 622.  In the first round of elimination, she faced 28th-ranked Iwona Marcinkiewicz of Poland.  Kawasaki lost 119-106 in the 18-arrow match, placing 63rd overall in women's individual archery.

Kawasaki was also a member of the 14th-place Japanese women's archery team.

Link
2004Japan Olympic Committee

1976 births
Living people
Japanese female archers
Olympic archers of Japan
Archers at the 2004 Summer Olympics
21st-century Japanese women